Unleashed is a compilation album by Australian dance-pop singer Dannii Minogue. It was released by Rhino Entertainment and Warner Music UK on 5 November 2007. As this was a budget release compilation, it was ineligible for the UK Albums Chart.

Album history
The album contains unreleased tracks and remixes personally chosen by the singer. Commenting on the album's release, Minogue said, "This album is about my personal favourites - bringing you the best unreleased material, including club mixes that were number one and songs I've written with my favourite producers around the world."

The new material for the album was recorded in 2003 and 2004 for what was to be the follow up to Neon Nights with London Records, except "Blame It on the Music", which was produced by Roger Sanchez and was recorded during the Neon Nights sessions in 2002.

The original track listing as advertised on play.com featured four additional tracks. "Weak", "Fear of Flying", "Karma Is a Bitch" and "Healing on the Dancefloor", composed by Swedish production duo Korpi & Blackcell, disappeared from the final release for unknown reasons. The four tracks eventually leaked on SoundCloud in September 2011.

Track listing

Release history

Cancelled The Platinum Collection album

The Platinum Collection was originally planned for release in 2006 by Minogue's former label Warner Bros. Records, as part of a series of back catalogue compilations released for other artists on their roster. However, it was cancelled due to Warner Music attempting to the release the album with material contained within Minogue's severance deal with London Records. It was replaced with the release of her second greatest hits album The Hits & Beyond later in 2006, plus Unleashed a year later.

Planned track listing
 "All I Wanna Do" (radio version)
 "Everything I Wanted" (album version)
 "Disremembrance" (Flexifingers Radio Edit)
 "Coconut"
 "Heaven Can Wait" (7" mix)
 "Someone New" (7" version)
 "Est-ce que tu m'aimes encore?" (Riva featuring Dannii)
 "Put the Needle on It" (radio edit)
 "Begin to Spin Me Round" (radio edit)
 "Don't Wanna Lose This Groove" (radio edit)
 "It Won't Work Out" (single mix)
 "Come and Get It" (alternative radio version)
 "Blame It on the Music"
 "Tut Tut (Does Your Mother Know?)"
 "Undeniable"
 "Karma Is a Bitch"
 "Viva L'amour"
 "Each Finger Has an Attitude"
 "It Won't Work Out" (acoustic version)

Notes

2007 compilation albums
Dannii Minogue compilation albums